Mihaela Popa (born April 16, 1962) is a politician from Romania. A member of the Democratic Liberal Party, she served as a member of the European Parliament (2007–2009). Mihaela Popa has been a member of the Senate of Romania since 2008.

Political activity

Valeriu Boboc Prize 
The initiative regarding founding Valeriu Boboc Prize for the liberty of press and defending of democratic values was launched on April 19, 2010 by Mihaela Popa. She said in front of the Senate that "April 7 events opened the way of Moldova to Europe and Boboc is no longer just a name, but a symbol of struggle for democratic values and freedom of expression." On April 23, the newspaper of a former ally of Communists Iurie Roşca, Flux, had a very hostile reaction to the initiative. The memorandum regarding founding the Prize "Valeriu Boboc" for the liberty of press and defending of democratic values was adopted on April 30, 2010 by the permanent bureau of the Romanian Senate.

Notes

External links
 AlegeriTV – Mihaela Popa
 Evenimentul Zilei, 27 noiembrie 2007 – Mihaela Popa – Profesor de matematică
 Parlamentul European – Mihaela Popa

1962 births
Living people
Democratic Liberal Party (Romania) politicians
Members of the Senate of Romania
21st-century Romanian women politicians
People from Huși
Democratic Liberal Party (Romania) MEPs
Women MEPs for Romania
MEPs for Romania 2007–2009
21st-century Romanian politicians